Cyril Archibald (1837 – April 13, 1914) was an Ontario political figure. He represented Stormont in the House of Commons of Canada as a Liberal member from 1872 to 1878.

He was born in Osnabruck Township in Upper Canada in 1837, the son of John Archibald and Eliza Dixon. He was educated at Upper Canada College and later served in the local militia. In 1881, he married Gertrude Wood. Archibald served as reeve of Osnabruck from 1866 to 1869. Archibald also served as paymaster for the local militia. In 1881, he went to Dundas, Minnesota, where he joined his brother Edward's flour milling business. He retired from that business in 1892 and moved to Northfield, Minnesota, where he died in 1914.

References 

1837 births
1914 deaths
Liberal Party of Canada MPs
Members of the House of Commons of Canada from Ontario
People from Northfield, Minnesota
People from the United Counties of Stormont, Dundas and Glengarry
People from Rice County, Minnesota
Upper Canada College alumni